Kevin J. Mullen (October 7, 1935 in San Francisco – April 18, 2011 in Novato, California) was an American crime writer.

Life
Mulen served in the 82nd Airborne Division. 
He served with the San Francisco Police Department, from 1959 to 1985, reaching the rank of deputy chief.
He has written in magazines and newspapers (The San Francisco Chronicle) on criminal justice issues.

Awards
 2006 American Book Award

Works
 SFPD Homicide Case Fil e: Introduction for The Body in the Bay, produced by Paul Drexler and Julie Marsh

Newspaper columns

"The Zebra Murders: An Alternative Perspective", The San Francisco Chronicle

Memoir

References

External links

1935 births
2011 deaths
American crime writers
American police officers
Writers from San Francisco
American Book Award winners